Pink TV is Europe's second gay satellite channel (after Italy's GAY.tv), started in France on 25 October 2004, on a subscription basis, mostly funded by TF1 and Canal Plus, terrestrial channels in France. It is now possible to access Pink TV via satellite, cable and DSL providers. Highlights include Queer as Folk, as well as talkshows (including So Graham Norton).  There is an X-rated film four times a week after midnight, and the channel broadcasts 24 hours per day, including productions from porn studios including French Twinks. Pink X launched in 2012 a pornographic reward, the PinkX Gay Video Awards.

History
On 25 October 2004, Pink TV was born on cable and satellite in the form of a pay-TV channel.

On 12 March 2007, when the channel's accounts were bad, the Conseil supérieur de l'audiovisuel accepted the Pink TV project, which consisted of splitting the antenna into two: the day, the usual programs (cultural, entertainment, information expressing homosexual culture and lifestyles) and from midnight onwards, a service that broadcasts pornographic programs. Since 4 September 2007, Pink TV has been broadcasting free-to-air two hours a day from 10 pm to midnight. Its grid is composed only of rebroadcasts. Then, starting at midnight, it transmits encrypted until 5 am with a paying offer consisting only of X-rated movies called Pink X.

As of October 2008, the channel's accounts have improved, it released new programs (films, documentaries, shows) alongside the rebroadcasts.

But, in 2012, fewer and fewer operators are broadcasting Pink TV in clear two hours a day.

Also, since July 2013, Pink TV has stopped broadcasting real programs between 10 pm and midnight. Instead, it offered short-lived scenes without words played by two different couples.

At the moment, no program is offered from 22:00 to 00:00. Pink X programs start at 00:00. Launched as a chain of homosexual culture, but not having found its audience, it now only broadcasts pornographic films.

Shareholders 
 M. Pascal Houzelot : 29.92%
 Canal+ : 17.52%
 Groupe TF1 : 11.44%
 Société M6 Thématique : 9.15%
 Société Connection : 9.15%
 Société Siges : 8.79%
 Société Hélios (Groupe Lagardère) : 8.73%
 Société Financière Pinault : 1.93%
 M. Pierre Bergé : 1.93%
 Société Sophia Asset Management Ltd : 0.48%
 M. Henri Biard : 0.48%
 Société Tilder : 0.48%

Notable programming
(presenters in parenthesis)
L’Agenda clubbing (Anthony Aréal)
Bibliothèque Pink (Pascal Sevran)
Bonheur, bonheur, bonheur (Éric Guého)
Ça s’est passé comme ça (Frédéric Mitterrand)
Cours chez Pink (Mathieu Lecerf)
Le Débat (Laurent Drezner, Thomas Joubert, Alex Taylor) 
Face à Pink (Claire Chazal, Frédéric Mitterrand)
Hétéro mais pas trop! (Laurent Artufel)
Le je/nous de Claire (Claire Chazal)
Les Pieds dans le plat mais pas trop! (Laurent Artufel, Éric Guého)
Le Set (Christophe Beaugrand, Marie Labory, Raphaël Pathé)
Pink Pong (Marie Labory)
Zap’Pink (Laurent Artufel, Christophe Renaud)

PinkX Gay Video Awards
The PinkX Gay Video Awards are annual gay pornographic awards in various categories. The Awards were launched by Pink TV in 2012 (later renamed Pink X) based on pornographic films included on the channel's programming.

Best New Cummer

Best Duo

Best Active

Best Passive

Best Group

Best Amateur Film

Best Ethnic Film 
(Category suspended in 2018)

Best Actor

Best Director

Best Foreign Film 
{| class="wikitable"
! Year
! Title
! Distributor
! Nominations
|-
! style="background-color: #FF80DF" | 2012
| Slick Dogs
| Titan Media
|
|-
! style="background-color: #FF80DF" | 2013
| Incubusby François Sagat and Brian Mills
| Titan Media
| 
|-
! style="background-color: #FF80DF" | 2014
| Stalkerby Mr. Pam
| Naked Sword
| London Spunked (All Worlds) by Chi Chi LaRueThe Ultimate Top (Jet Set) by Chris SteeleCottage Boy (Eurocreme) by Blacky MendezStudio of Sin (UK Naked Men) by JonnoDaddy’s Boy (DadsFuckingLads)  by Andy O’Neill
|-
! style="background-color: #FF80DF" | 2015
| Sentenced & Punishedby Chi Chi LaRue
| Rascal Video
| Addict (Mr. Pam, Naked Sword)Broken (Asley Rider, Bulldog)Daddy Knows Best (Andy O'Neill, Dads Fucks Lads)Frat House Cream (Mr. Pam, Naked Sword)Jake Bass and ses amants (Jake Jaxson, CockyBoys)
|-
! style="background-color: #FF80DF" | 2016
| The Amazing Cocky Boys
| CockyBoys
| Dirty Rascals (Naked Sword)Clusterfuck! 1 (Raging Stallion)Baiseurs d'exception (Dominic Ford)Twinks on Top (Phoenixxx)Hooded (UK Hot Jocks)
|-
! style="background-color: #FF80DF" | 2017
| Don't Make Him Beg de Jonno
| UKNakedMen
| A Man & His Boy by Jake JaxsonBerkeley by mr. PamAbducted by Blacky MendezTahoe: Cozy Up by Tony DiMarcoSpanish Milk by JP Dubois & Sam Barclay
|-
! style="background-color: #FF80DF" | 2018
| Paris Perfect de Mr Parker
| NakedSword
| Ultra FanCauke for FreeThe Stillest HourSilverlakeRubbergeddon
|}

 Best French Film 

Further reading
"Not 'communautaire' but 'identitaire': Linguistic Acrobatics on France's PinkTV," Contemporary French Civilization'', Winter-Spring 2008, volume 32, no.1.

References

External links
 Official Site 
 Pink X 

LGBT-related television channels
Gay pornographic television channels
Television stations in France
Television channels and stations established in 2004
LGBT-related mass media in France
Television pornography